Elachista eriodes is a moth of the family Elachistidae. It is found in the Australia state of New South Wales and on the Fleurieu Peninsula in South Australia.

The wingspan is about 12.4 mm for males and 12.2 mm for females. The forewings are blue. The hindwings are grey.

The larvae feed on Lepidosperma species. They mine the leaves of their host plant. Young larvae mine upwards, creating a straight and narrow initial stage of the mine. Later, the mine slowly widens and turns downwards. The whole mine, except the last 20 mm, is filled with frass. Pupation takes place outside of the mine on a leaf of the host plant.

References

Moths described in 2011
eriodes
Moths of Australia
Taxa named by Lauri Kaila